George Fung (died 15 May 1979) was a Trinidadian cricketer. He played in one first-class match for Trinidad and Tobago in 1936/37.

See also
 List of Trinidadian representative cricketers

References

External links
 

Year of birth missing
1979 deaths
Trinidad and Tobago cricketers